AGF Håndbold is a handball club from Aarhus, Denmark. Currently, AGF Håndbold competes in the women's Danish 1st Division. The home arena of the club is Atletion.

See also 
Aarhus Gymnastikforening

References

External links
 Official website

Danish handball clubs
Aarhus Municipality